Tulearia is a genus of flowering plants belonging to the family Rubiaceae.

Its native range is Madagascar.

Species:
 Tulearia capsaintemariensis De Block 
 Tulearia splendida De Block

References

Rubiaceae
Rubiaceae genera